José Cuevas may refer to:

 José Cuevas (boxer) (born 1957), Mexican former world champion boxer
 Jose Cuevas (soccer) (born 1989), American soccer player
 José Luis Cuevas (1934–2017), modernist painter, printmaker, sculptor, and writer